Vladimir Brezhnev (March 5, 1935 – March 20, 1996) was an ice hockey player who played in the Soviet Hockey League.  He played for HC CSKA Moscow. He was inducted into the Russian and Soviet Hockey Hall of Fame in 1965. He was born and died in Moscow.

External links
 Russian and Soviet Hockey Hall of Fame bio

1935 births
1996 deaths
Soviet ice hockey players
Ice hockey people from Moscow
HC CSKA Moscow players